The I-4 satellites are made up of the INMARSAT BGAN, FleetBroadband and SwiftBroadband communications network. They provide Internet and telecom connections anywhere on Earth, except in polar regions.

Data services
Two general types of data services are currently provided:
Streaming
Background

Streaming 
Streaming is a guaranteed delivery style of service. A terminal requests a context of X bandwidth (currently 8, 16, 32, 64, 128, or 256 kbit/s) and, if the current spot beam has enough resources available, it is allocated a guaranteed chunk of the available bandwidth. Therefore, if a request is made 8k streaming context, the terminal will, at all times, be able to send data at 8 kbit/s. As a result, streaming is billed based on time usage.

Background 
Background is a best-effort style of service. Each spot beam provides a certain amount of usable bandwidth. The bandwidth which is not in use by Streaming contexts is used for Background contexts.  This means that the actual amount of bandwidth received with a background context will vary over time. The theoretical maximum bandwidth available is  approximately 400 kbit/s. As a result, background contexts are billed based on volume instead of time usage.

See also 

 Inmarsat-4 F1
 Inmarsat-4 F3
 Inmarsat-4A F4

Communications satellites